The Unofficial Football World Championships (UFWC) is an informal way of calculating the world's best international association football team, using a knock-out title system similar to that used in professional boxing. The UFWC was formalized and published by English journalist Paul Brown in 2003.

The title is currently held by Argentina, who won it from Croatia on 13 December 2022.

Background
The idea stemmed originally from some Scotland fans and sections of the media jokingly asserting that as they beat England (who had won the 1966 World Cup) in a British Home Championship match on 15 April 1967—England's first loss after their FIFA World Cup victory—they were the "Unofficial World Champions".

In 2003, freelance journalist Paul Brown defined the rules of the UFWC, traced its lineage and wrote an article in football magazine FourFourTwo. In 2011, Brown authored a book on the subject. Brown also created the championship's website which tracks its progression.

The Unofficial Football World Championships is not sanctioned by FIFA, nor does it have any sort of official backing. The winner is awarded a virtual trophy—the C.W. Alcock Cup, named after him as he was a major instigator in the development of international football in his role as FA secretary.

Rules
The first team to win an international football match were declared first ever Unofficial Football World Champions.
This was England, who defeated Scotland 4–2 in 1873 in the second full international match, the first in 1872 having been a 0–0 draw between the same two nations.
The next full international (international 'A' match) involving the title holder is considered a title match, with the winners taking the title.
In the event of a title match being a draw, the current holders of the title remain champions.
UFWC title matches are decided by their ultimate outcome, including extra time and penalties.
Title matches are contested under the rules of the governing body by which they are sanctioned.

Tracking the Championship
While the Unofficial Football World Championship was invented in 2003, the rules are such that results are analysed retrospectively to determine the theoretical lineage of champions from the very first international matches. A comprehensive list of results of all championship games is maintained on the UFWC website.

Early international football
The first ever FIFA-recognised international match was a 0–0 draw between England and Scotland, on 30 November 1872 at Hamilton Crescent. The Unofficial World Championship thus remained vacant until the same two teams met again at the Kennington Oval on 8 March 1873. England won 4–2, and so are regarded as having become the inaugural Unofficial Football World Champions.

Early international football was almost entirely confined to the British Isles. Wales entered the UFWC 'competition' in 1876—holding it for the first time in 1907, and Ireland (the team representing the Belfast-based Irish Football Association, subsequently known as Northern Ireland) in 1882—first recording a UFWC victory in 1927. The UFWC title swapped between the Home Nations teams several times in this period, and was first competed by a non-British Isles team in 1909, when England defeated Hungary in Budapest.

The fact that none of the Home Nations teams competed in the 1930, 1934, or 1938 World Cups kept the title from travelling too far abroad, and the First and Second World Wars hindered football's globalisation process further.

1930s–2000s
It was 1931 when the title was first passed outside the British Isles, to Austria in their third attempt with a 5–0 victory over Scotland. They held the title until 7 December 1932 when they lost 4–3 to England at Stamford Bridge, and for all but the last few months of the decade it was held by those four teams. In the 1940s, the title was held by continental teams, notably those representing the Axis powers and countries neutral during World War II, but was recaptured by England in time for the 1950 World Cup. Here, in a shock result, they lost to the United States in one of the biggest upsets ever; it was the first venture of the title onto the Americas, and stayed there because Chile immediately took it with their win in the last game of the group stage which wasn't enough to qualify for the later stages. This made 1950 both the first World Cup where the title was at stake and not captured by the winners. It remained in the Americas for all but one of the following 16 years.

This time included the four-day reign of Netherlands Antilles, who beat Mexico 2–1 in a CONCACAF Championship match to become the smallest country ever to hold the title.

The UFWC returned to Europe in time for the 1966 FIFA World Cup with the Soviet Union. They lost the championship in the semi-final to West Germany, who lost the final to England. The following year, the England v Scotland match of 1967, which first gave rise to the idea of an unofficial world championship, really was a UFWC title match. With West Germany's victory over Netherlands in the 1974 World Cup Final, West Germany became the first team to hold the World Cup, European Championship and the UFWC at the same time. The title stayed in Europe until 1978, when it was taken by Argentina, the winners of the 1978 World Cup. It remained in South America until the 1982 World Cup where Peru lost to Poland. The UFWC remained in Europe for the next ten years, except for a one-year tenure by Argentina.

In 1992, the title returned to the United States and then was held for one match by Australia, before it worked its way through several South American nations, back through Europe and to its first Asian holders, South Korea, who defeated Colombia in the 1995 Carlsberg Cup semi-final. The Koreans lost the title to FR Yugoslavia in their next match, and the UFWC remained in Europe until March 1998 when Germany lost it to Brazil in a friendly. Argentina then defeated Brazil in a friendly to carry the UFWC into the 1998 World Cup.

France repeated Argentina's 1978 feat by taking the title as they won the World Cup on home turf, beating Brazil 3–0 in the final. England took the title for the last time to date at UEFA Euro 2000. France and Spain enjoyed spells as champions before the Netherlands won the title in March 2002. As the Dutch had failed to qualify for the 2002 World Cup, the UFWC was, unusually, not at stake at the official World Cup. The Netherlands retained the title until 10 September 2003, when they lost a Euro 2004 qualifier 3–1 to the Czech Republic.

2004–2010 
The Czechs defended their title a few times, before losing it to the Republic of Ireland in a friendly via a last-minute winner by Robbie Keane. The title then went to an African nation for the first time, as they lost it to Nigeria. Angola won and kept this title through late 2004 and early 2005. They were then beaten by Zimbabwe (in a match that tripled as a World Cup qualifier and an African Nations qualifier), who held the title for six months before Nigeria re-gained it in October 2005. Nigeria were beaten by Romania, who lost it to Uruguay within six months. Uruguay became the highest ranked team to hold the title since 2004, but their failure to qualify for the World Cup finals meant that, for the second time in succession, the unofficial title was not available at the official championships.

The title was brought back to Europe by Georgia on 15 November 2006, with both goals scored by Levan Kobiashvili in a 2–0 victory. They lost the title to the highest ranked team in the UFWC of all time, Scotland, on 24 March 2007, nearly forty years since Scotland had last gained the title. Just four days later, Scotland conceded the title 2–0 to FIFA World Cup holders Italy, and the title passed through the hands of Hungary twice, Turkey, Greece and Sweden before being claimed by the Netherlands, who eventually lost the title to Spain in the 2010 FIFA World Cup Final after a run that saw more successful defences than any other reign with 21.

2010–present
The European sojourn of the title was brought to an end when Argentina beat Spain 4–1 in a September 2010 friendly, and after beating the Argentines in a friendly, Japan brought the title to the Asian Cup for the first time in 2011, and remained unbeaten throughout the tournament. Scheduled defences of the title were cancelled after the 2011 earthquake and tsunami, and they held the title for over a year before relinquishing it to North Korea, ranked 124th in the world by FIFA, the lowest ranking of a UFWC champion since the rankings were introduced in 1993. North Korea continued to hold title through their successful campaign in the 2012 AFC Challenge Cup, where low-ranked nations Philippines, Tajikistan, India, Palestine, and Turkmenistan challenged, the last of whom almost pulled off a major upset. North Korea's reign was memorable for the fact that so many low-ranking teams challenged to become holders of the crown – as well as the aforementioned AFC Challenge Cup, low ranking nations competing in the 2013 EAFF East Asian Cup second preliminary round such as Kuwait, Indonesia, Chinese Taipei, Guam, and Hong Kong all unsuccessfully attempted to take the title away from North Korea.

The title was finally taken from North Korea by Sweden in the 2013 King's Cup, a result not recorded as a full international by FIFA, but nevertheless considered valid by the UFWC website. In a friendly in February, Sweden were beaten by Argentina who took the title to South America. In October, Argentina lost a FIFA World Cup qualifier to Uruguay.

Uruguay took the UFWC into Group D of the 2014 FIFA World Cup.
During the group-stage an already-eliminated England challenged Costa Rica for the UFWC in their third group-stage game and the UFWC was mooted as a potential consolation prize in the British press, however the match was drawn and Costa Rica took the UFWC into the knockout phase.
The UFWC and World Cup were "unified", with Germany securing both in the final.

Shortly after the World Cup, the runners-up Argentina beat Germany in a friendly to claim the UFWC title. This reign ended one match later, when Brazil won the UFWC title after winning 2014 Superclásico de las Américas.

Brazil held onto the title to take it into the 2015 Copa América, where it ended up with tournament winners Chile. Chile lost the title to Uruguay who took it into the Copa América Centenario, but regained it before winning the tournament. The UFWC was exchanged between CONMEBOL sides during 2018 FIFA World Cup qualification, and remained in South America despite being contested by outside teams during Chile's successful 2017 China Cup campaign. Ultimately it was Peru took the Championship into the 2018 World Cup where the title ended with tournament victors France.

For the next four years, the title was traded between UEFA teams, with most matches being either Euro 2020 qualifying, UEFA Nations League and World Cup 2022 qualifying games. In terms of number of consecutive title defences, the 2020–2021 streak by Italy, which included their victorious UEFA Euro 2020 campaign, was the joint longest in UFWC history (tied with the Netherlands in 2008–2010). The 2022 World Cup ended with victors Argentina also holding the 2021 Copa América and the UFWC.

All-time rankings
The UFWC website maintains an all-time ranking table of teams, sorting by number of championship matches won. Owing mostly to their successes in the early years of international football, where competition was almost entirely limited to the British Isles, the top ranked team is Scotland, followed by England.

UFWC at major championships
Due to the nature of group stages, a team may win or retain the UFWC without qualifying for the knock-out stages of a competition. If, on the other hand, the UFWC champion reaches the knock-out stage, then the title of that competition will be unified with the UFWC.

Global

World Cup

No team has ever successfully defended the unofficial world championship title through a World Cup Finals. The Netherlands have come closest, remaining unbeaten in both the 1974 and 2010 competitions right up until the final, where they lost to West Germany and Spain respectively. West Germany were also beaten finalists in 1986, but the title changed hands four times during the tournament.

By necessity, each time the UFWC holder makes it to the knockout stage of a FIFA World Cup, a reunion of the two titles occurs, since the knockout format ensures that the UFWC trophy will be handed on throughout the games into the final. There it will be won by the team which also wins the World Cup. It is, however, possible that the UFWC holder is eliminated in the group stage of the World Cup and leaves the tournament as reigning UFWC champion, in which case no reunion occurs; this happened to Chile in 1950, Mexico in 1962 and Colombia in 1994.

Confederations Cup

Continental
The championships of each of the continental championships are only listed when the UFWC was contested during the tournament. The continental championships of Africa and Oceania have not yet seen competition for this title.

European Championship

UEFA Nations League Finals

Copa América

CONCACAF Gold Cup

Asian Cup

Book

Freelance journalist Paul Brown, who wrote the original FourFourTwo article on the UFWC and created the UFWC website, wrote a book on the championship which was published by Superelastic in 2011. Written in English, it has also been translated into Japanese. , four editions of the book have been published, with the latest UFWC developments added to each.

Similar concepts
The concept of such a title is not unique to the UFWC, similar concepts, with different rules and therefore different lineages, are discussed below.

UFWC Spin-offs
The online community at the UFWC website keeps track of UFWC-like linages confined to each FIFA confederation. A Women's Unofficial Football World Championships can be traced back either to the first FIFA-recognised women's international in 1971 (a 4–0 victory for France over The Netherlands) or to earlier internationals that are not FIFA recognised.

Nasazzi's Baton and Netto's Baton
A similar virtual title, Nasazzi's Baton, traces the "championship" from the first World Cup winners Uruguay, after whose captain it is named. Nasazzi's Baton follows the same rules as the UFWC, except that it treats all matches according to their result after 90 minutes. Another virtual title, Netto's Baton, follows the same rules but is traced from the first UEFA European Championship winners Soviet Union and is confined to UEFA member national teams.

Virtual World Championship
Another virtual title, the Virtual World Championship, operates along the same boxing-style lines but only counts matches in FIFA-recognised championships and their qualifying stages. This is to circumvent the criticism of the UFWC that because countries do not always play their strongest teams in non-competitive matches, the honour could be unwittingly lost by a sub-strength team. This title is traced from the 1908 Olympic Games, and treats all matches according to their result after 90 minutes. Olympic competitions since 1936 are not considered, as full international teams ceased to take part after that tournament.

Pound for Pound World Championship
Another similar competition, the Pound for Pound World Championship (PPWC), was created by Scottish football magazine The Away End. This title only recognises competitive games, although it recognises many unofficial tournaments which are considered to be friendlies by FIFA. As with the UFWC, extra time and penalties are taken into account in defining the winner of a match. It only counts games from as far back as the first FIFA World Cup in 1930, and states that no matter who holds the title of Pound for Pound World Champion they must relinquish the crown at the beginning of every World Cup finals. At the end of the tournament the World Cup winners are crowned the new Pound for Pound World Champions. Therefore, the tournament is "reset" every four years.

Notes

References

External links
Unofficial Football World Championships
On Twitter
Bâton de Nasazzi (French Wikipedia page) or Nasazzi's Baton (also in French)
The Away End – Pound for Pound World Championship

Association football rankings
History of association football